"The Legend of Boo-Kini Bottom" is the fifth episode of the eleventh season, and the 220th overall episode of the American animated television series SpongeBob SquarePants. It originally aired on Nickelodeon in the United States on October 13, 2017. In this episode, the Flying Dutchman wants to make sure SpongeBob and his friends are scared on Halloween. It is one of two SpongeBob episodes animated through stop-motion instead of the usual 2D format, the other being, "It's a SpongeBob Christmas!".

Summary
On Halloween night, SpongeBob and Patrick prepare to go trick-or-treating. SpongeBob soon tells Patrick that he is scared of Halloween because of the costumes and decorations, but Patrick tricks SpongeBob into thinking "Scary equals funny".

They arrive at Sandy's house, where Sandy introduces them to her acorn monster. Patrick becomes terrified, but SpongeBob remains unaffected, believing "Scary equals funny". They both go to the Krusty Krab and the Chum Bucket, which are dressed as the opposite restaurant. At the Krusty Krab, Mr. Krabs tells them how Plankton makes chum, while at the Chum Bucket, Plankton and Karen tell a false story of how Mr. Krabs makes Krabby Patties; Both stories fail to frighten SpongeBob. Meanwhile, the Flying Dutchman becomes happy that the residents of Bikini Bottom are scared on Halloween, but SpongeBob's laughter interrupt him, and he descends to the town below.

After SpongeBob tells the Flying Dutchman about Patrick's deception, he decides to put SpongeBob and Patrick on a thriller ride to scare them. Although the ride frightens Patrick, SpongeBob enjoys the experience. The Flying Dutchman becomes furious, and locks up the souls of SpongeBob's friends. Patrick confesses that he lied to SpongeBob, returning the latter's fears. SpongeBob escapes, and returns to confront the Flying Dutchman with Sandy's acorn monster. The Flying Dutchman attacks him, saying that a sponge is too stupid to be scary. Plankton disagrees, saying that SpongeBob's stupidity is the scariest thing. Thinking this is false, the Flying Dutchman goes into SpongeBob's brain, where he is spooked by an imaginary baby SpongeBob. He flees the town, releasing the souls of SpongeBob's friends. The friends gather and celebrate Halloween together.

Production
The episode was confirmed by Kaz on April 7, 2017. It was reported by The Hollywood Reporter on June 20, 2017, that the episode was in post-production.

Sally Cruikshank made a short sequence for this episode.

Reception
The episode was watched by 2.210 million viewers, beating its lead out The Loud House by 44,000 viewers, and bringing a 0.47 18-49 rating, making it the eighth highest rated cable program of the day.

Merchandising
"The Legend of Boo-Kini Bottom" was released on a DVD of the same name on September 11, 2018, by Nickelodeon and Paramount Home Entertainment. The DVD includes the episode itself and some bonus materials. On March 31, 2020, "The Legend of Boo-Kini Bottom" was released on the SpongeBob SquarePants: The Complete Eleventh Season DVD, alongside all episodes of the eleventh season.

References

External links

 

SpongeBob SquarePants episodes
2017 American television episodes
Halloween television episodes
Stop-motion animated television episodes
2010s animated television specials